Aung Thaw (born c. 1920) is a Burmese archaeologist and Emeritus Director-General of the Archaeological Survey of Burma. 

Between 1959 and 1968, he excavated and studied intensely the historical site of Beikthano (Peikthanomyo). He published many works which are today seen as authoritative papers on this site including a Preliminary report on the excavation at Peikthanomyo and his conclusive  findings in 1968. In 1972, he published a book on Historical sites in Burma and in 1993 co-authored a book on Ancient Myanmar Cities with Than Shwe, Sein Maung Oo, and Myint Aung.

References 

1930s births
Living people
Burmese archaeologists